Albert Oscar Brown (July 18, 1852March 28, 1937) was an American lawyer, banker, and Republican politician from Manchester, New Hampshire.

Biography
He was born on July 18, 1852, in Northwood, New Hampshire and graduated from Coe-Brown Northwood Academy in 1874.  He graduated from Dartmouth College in 1878 and Boston University School of Law in 1884.

Brown married Susie J. Clarke in Ayer, Massachusetts, on December 30, 1888.

In 1905 Brown was elected the President of the Amoskeag Savings Bank to succeed Otis Barton.

In June 1911 Brown was elected by the alumni to be a trustee of Dartmouth College,  serving until 1931.

Brown served a single term as Governor of New Hampshire from 1921 to 1923.

He died on March 28, 1937, in Manchester, New Hampshire.

Corporate involvement
Brown was also a member of a number of corporate boards, including the Amoskeag Savings Bank.

References

External links
Brown at New Hampshire's Division of Historic Resources
 The Papers of Albert Oscar Brown at Dartmouth College Library

1852 births
1937 deaths
People from Northwood, New Hampshire
American Congregationalists
Republican Party governors of New Hampshire
Politicians from Manchester, New Hampshire
Dartmouth College alumni
Boston University School of Law alumni